This is a list of notable astrological organizations. 

 American Federation of Astrologers, US
 Astrological Association of Great Britain, United Kingdom 
 Faculty of Astrological Studies, United Kingdom 
 Kepler College, US
 National Council for Geocosmic Research, US
 Rosicrucian Fellowship, US
 The Sophia Centre, United Kingdom

Historical
 Kraków School of Mathematics and Astrology (15th Century), Kraków, Poland 

 
Astrological
Astrology-related lists